The Blaireau Case (French:L'affaire Blaireau) is a 1923 French silent film directed by Louis Osmont and starring André Brunot, Émile Saint-Ober and Marise Dorval. Based on a play by Alphonse Allais, it was remade twice in 1932 as The Blaireau Case and in 1958 as Neither Seen Nor Recognized.

Cast
 André Brunot as Blaireau  
 Émile Saint-Ober as Maître Guilloche 
 Marise Dorval as Delphine de Serquigny  
 Marcelle Duval as Arabella de Chaville  
 Anny Fleurville as Madame de Chaville  
 Gaston Gabaroche as Jules Fléchard  
 Heller as Parju  
 Geo Leclercq as Baron de Hautpertuis  
 De Winter as Monsieur Bluette

References

Bibliography 
 Alfred Krautz. International directory of cinematographers set- and costume designers in film. Saur, 1983.

External links 
 

1923 films
French silent films
1920s French-language films
Pathé films
French films based on plays
French black-and-white films
1920s French films